Andrés Felipe Montoya Pulgarín (born 30 August 1990) is a Spanish competitive figure skater. He has won seven international medals and is an eight-time Spanish national medalist, having won two silver and six bronze medals. He finished within the top twenty at two European Championships (2016, 2018) and placed 29th at the 2018 Winter Olympics.

Personal life 
Montoya was born on 30 August 1990 in Pereira, Colombia. He moved to Spain when he was eight years old.

Career 
Montoya began learning to skate in 2003. He trained at Txuri-Berri Club de Hielo in San Sebastián until 2012, when he moved to SAD Majadahonda in Madrid.

In December 2015, Montoya won the silver medal at the Spanish Championships, ranking between Javier Fernández and Javier Raya. He was assigned to his first ISU Championships – the 2016 European Championships, held in January in Bratislava. He qualified to the final segment in Slovakia, placing 17th in the short program, 19th in the free skate, and 17th overall.

At the 2017 World Championships, Fernández earned two spots for Spain in the men's event at the 2018 Winter Olympics. The Federación Española Deportes de Hielo (FEDH) decided that the second spot would go to the skater who received the highest combined score at the 2017 CS Golden Spin of Zagreb and Spanish Championships. Montoya outscored Raya by 26.61 points at Golden Spin and finished third at the Spanish Championships with a 2.77 deficit versus Raya, resulting in a final advantage of 23.84 points. On 17 December 2017, FEDH confirmed that Montoya would compete at the Olympics.

In January, Montoya qualified to the final segment at the 2018 European Championships in Moscow; he ranked 22nd in the short program, 19th in the free skate, and 20th overall. In February, he competed at the 2018 Winter Olympics in PyeongChang, South Korea. He placed 29th in the short program.

Programs

Competitive highlights

References

External links 
 

1990 births
Spanish male single skaters
Living people
People from Pereira, Colombia
Sportspeople from San Sebastián
Colombian emigrants to Spain
Figure skaters at the 2018 Winter Olympics
Olympic figure skaters of Spain
Competitors at the 2015 Winter Universiade
Competitors at the 2013 Winter Universiade